An Afghani burger (also known as the Kabuli burger) is an Afghan fast food wrap consisting of a piece of Afghan bread rolled around french fries, along with chutney and other condiments, vegetables, and often sausages or other meat. It borrows influences from Afghan cuisine and was popularized inside Pakistan by Afghan immigrants (especially in Islamabad, where it is considered one of the staple street foods of the city, and Peshawar).

See also
 Wrap (sandwich)
 Shawarma
 Gyro (food)

Notes

Afghan cuisine
Fast food
Sandwiches
Pashtun cuisine
Pakistani fusion cuisine